Jussi Koivula (born 24 December 1983) is a Finnish professional boxer who has challenged twice for the European welterweight title in 2016 and 2017.

Professional career
Koivula made his professional debut on 30 August 2008, scoring a third-round stoppage over Tibor Rafael. He would fight exclusively in Finland for the next six years, remaining undefeated until 20 April 2013, when Łukasz Maciec stopped him in five rounds. On 7 February 2015, Koivula fought away from home for the first time in an attempt to win the vacant IBF Inter-Continental junior-middleweight title, but lost a unanimous decision to Marcello Matano in Italy. Another visit to Italy, on 22 April 2016, saw Koivula challenge unsuccessfully for the vacant European welterweight title, being stopped in nine rounds by Leonard Bundu.

Professional boxing record

References

External links
 

Finnish male boxers
Welterweight boxers
Light-middleweight boxers
1983 births
People from Hämeenlinna
Living people
Sportspeople from Kanta-Häme